Felizzano (Flissan in Piemontese) is a comune (municipality) in the Province of Alessandria in the Italian region Piedmont, located about  southeast of Turin and about  west of Alessandria.

Felizzano borders the following municipalities: Altavilla Monferrato, Fubine, Masio, Oviglio, Quargnento, Quattordio, Solero, and Viarigi.

•

Demographic evolution 

a001
b001

References

Cities and towns in Piedmont